Vladislava Ovcharenko (born 18 December 1986, in Dushanbe) is a Tajikistani track and field sprinter. At the 2012 Summer Olympics, she competed in the Women's 200 metres.

Competition record

References

External links

1986 births
Living people
Sportspeople from Dushanbe
Tajikistani people of Russian descent
Tajikistani female sprinters
Olympic athletes of Tajikistan
Athletes (track and field) at the 2012 Summer Olympics
World Athletics Championships athletes for Tajikistan
Competitors at the 2013 Summer Universiade
Olympic female sprinters